Bridget Calitz (born 3 September 1997) is a South African international lawn bowler. She has represented South Africa at the Commonwealth Games and won a silver medal.

Biography
Calitz started bowling in 2011 and in 2019, she finished runner up in the singles at the South African National Bowls Championships.

Calitz was selected for the 2022 Commonwealth Games in Birmingham, where she competed in the women's triples and the women's fours event, reaching the final and winning a silver medal. Along with Esme Kruger, Johanna Snyman, and Thabelo Muvhango they lost in the final 17-10 to India.

References

1997 births
Living people
South African female bowls players
Bowls players at the 2022 Commonwealth Games
Commonwealth Games medallists in lawn bowls
Commonwealth Games bronze medallists for South Africa
Medallists at the 2022 Commonwealth Games